Damián Martínez (born 20 June 1990) is an Argentine footballer who plays as a forward.

Career
Martínez spent time in the youth systems of Gimnasia y Esgrima, Estudiantes and Cambaceres prior to beginning his senior career with Villa Montor in the Liga Amateur Platense. He subsequently joined CRIBA, before joining Primera B Metropolitana side Villa San Carlos on 26 July 2016. He made his professional debut on 17 October in a home defeat to Colegiales. In 2017, Martínez rejoined CRIBA; now of Torneo Federal B.

Career statistics
.

References

External links

1990 births
Living people
Place of birth missing (living people)
Argentine footballers
Association football forwards
Primera B Metropolitana players
Club Atlético Villa San Carlos footballers